Luca Cosi (born 16 April 1963) is a former Italian hurdler.

Achievements

National titles
Cosi won four national championships.
 Italian Athletics Championships
 400 m hs: 1983, 1985, 1986, 1988

References

External links
 

1963 births
Italian male hurdlers
Living people
Sportspeople from Arezzo